Terezín is a municipality and village in Hodonín District in the South Moravian Region of the Czech Republic. It has about 400 inhabitants.

References

Villages in Hodonín District
Moravian Slovakia